This is the discography of Turkish pop singer Demet Akalın, who has released ten studio albums, three extended plays (EP) and numerous singles.

Albums

Studio albums

Extended plays

Joint albums

Singles

Charts

References

External links 
 
Demet Akalın at Discogs

Discographies of Turkish artists
Pop music discographies